The Pétanque World Championships are international pétanque competitions organized by the International Federation of Petanque and Provençal game;  F.I.P.J.P. (Federation Internationale de Pétanque et Jeux Provençaux).

Overview 
The FIPJP Men's Triples World Championships were first held in 1959 in Spa, Belgium.  Additional championship categories were subsequently added for young people (jeunes), women, and for precision shooting (tir de precision). In 2015, a Singles World Championship was added.

Currently -
 Men's Triples Championships and the Precision Shooting World Championships are held every other year in even-numbered years.  
 Women's and Youth Championships, along with Men's Doubles, Women's Doubles, and Mixed Doubles, are held in odd-numbered years.

Pétanque is an official sport in several multisports competitions: World Games, Mediterranean Games, SEA Games, Asian indoor Games ( and soon Asian Games), Pacific Games, Indian Ocean Games and soon African Games (2015) and World Beach Games (2015). 
 
The four top countries so far are: France, Thailand, Belgium and Madagascar as per total world medal in 2018.

Championships scheduled to take place in Tahiti in 2014 were cancelled due to concern about the ebola epidemic.

Categories of championship
Current categories for Pétanque World Championships are :
 SINGLES (tête à tête) for MEN, WOMEN and YOUTH
 DOUBLES (doublette) for MEN, WOMEN and MIXED DOUBLES
 TRIPLES (triplette) for MEN, WOMEN and YOUTH
 PRECISION SHOOTING (tir de precision) for MEN, WOMEN and YOUTH

History

1958–2000 
 1958: Foundation of F.I.P.J.P on March 8, 1958, in Marseille, France, with seven member countries : Belgium, France, Morocco, Monaco, Switzerland, Tunisia and  Spain
 1959: First Men's Triples Championships ( Spa, Belgium ) originally held yearly this championship is now held every other year since 2008. (even-numbered years)
World Championship were not held in 1960, 62, 67, 68, 69 and 1970 due to managerial problems within the organisation
 1963: French Triple Team  François DE SOUZA, Marcel MARCOU and Fernand-André MARAVAL  with their third gold medal in a row.
 1971: A woman Michèle Decerf-Peelen plays in Belgium team and win bronze medal with her husband Claude Peelen and Bruno Somacal.
 1978 / 79: Italian Triple team Franco FERRO, Antonio NAPOLITANO  and Giovanni SERANDO win the gold title two years in a row.
 1987: First Youth Triples Championship ( Hasselt, Belgium ) : held every other year (odd-numbered years)
 1988: First Women's Triples Championship ( Palma de Mallorca, Spain ) : originally held every other year in even-numbered years this championship is held every other year in odd-numbered years since 2011 with the Youth Championship.
 1989: Thai Women Triple team Meesab PAIRAT, Somjitprasert VARAPORN  and Thongsri THAMAKORD win their second title in a row.
 1996 / 1998: Triple Teams are made up of four players allowing the replacement of one player in any game.

After 2000 
 2000: First Men's Precision Shooting Championship ; added to Men's Triples Championship ( São Brás de Alportel, Portugal )
 2001: First Youth Precision Shooting Championship ; added to Youth Triples Championship ( Lons-le-Saunier, France ). France Triple teams start a period of  8 Gold Titles in a row : 2001 > 2012 ;  they are the team to beat until now.
 2002: First Women's Precision Shooting Championship ; added to Women's Triples Championship ( La Tuque, Canada )
 2003: Phiippe QUINTAIS (France) - "The King"  - wins his 4th Precision Shooting Gold title in a row as well as his 8th Gold Triple Medal ( Geneva, Switzerland ). He holds the record of 12 Gold Medals since then. The French Triple "Dream Team" : Phiippe QUINTAIS,  Henry LACROIX, Philippe SUCHAUD, supported by Eric SIROT win their 3rd Gold medal in a row.
 2004: 2 (two) bronze medals are given from the 2004 Championships ( happened also in 1995).
 2005 / 06: PHUSA-AD Thaleungkiat (Thailand) wins the Gold Men Precision Shooting Title consecutively.
 2007: Final Game are played in 13 points for the first time (Pattaya, Thailand;) before that they were played in 15 points. In Junior Precision Shooting, the Swedish competitor is a girl - Jessica JOHANSSON - and wins the bronze medal.
 2008: Men Triple World Championships are limited to 48 countries and held every 2 years.
 2009: Angélique PAPON  (France) wins her 3rd Gold Women Precision Shooting Title in a row. Thongsri THAMAKORD  (Thailand) wins her 5th Gold Triple Title.
 2010: French Men Triple team Henry LACROIX, Philippe SUCHAUD, Thierry GRANDET  and  Bruno LE BOURSICAUD win their 3rd Gold Title in a row.
 2012: Philippe SUCHAUD wins his 10th Gold Triple Title with Henry LACROIX  (10th Gold Triple Titles),  Bruno LE BOURSICAUD (5th Gold Triple Titles) and Dylan ROCHER (1st Senior Gold Triple Title). Bruno LE BOURSICAUD wins his 2nd Precision Shooting Title in a row.
 2013: Thailand is Junior World Champion in Triple with a mixed team of 2 boys + 2 girls
 2014: The TAHITI (French Polynesia) Men World Championships are cancelled.
 2015: F.I.P.J.P. new logo. First Men & Women Singles World Championships ( Nice, France ) with 1st Single Men Champion Claudy WEIBEL (Belgium) and 1st Single Women Champion Yollanda MATARRANZ (Spain)

Palmares

MEN – Senior

Men TRIPLE (Triplette)

Men PRECISION SHOOTING (Tir de précision) 

The official World Record in Precision shooting is held by  Christophe Sévilla with 67 points / 100 ( 3 July 2011 - Macon - France ).

The best performance non recognised by F.I.P.J.P is held by Dylan Rocher with 75 points / 100 ( Corsica - France).

Men SINGLES   (Tête à Tête)

Men DOUBLE   (Doublette)

Men MEDALS BY NATION – Pétanque World Championships

WOMEN – Senior

Women TRIPLE (Triplette)

Women PRECISION SHOOTING (Tir de précision)

Women SINGLES (Tête à Tête)

Women DOUBLE (Doublette)

Women  MEDALS BY NATION - Pétanque World Championships

MIXED – Senior

Mixed Double (Doublette mixte )

YOUTH

Youth TRIPLE (Triplette)

Youth PRECISION SHOOTING (Tir de précision)

Youth  MEDALS BY NATION - Pétanque World Championships

Global World Ranking 
Including all medals from all MEN, WOMEN and YOUTH categories above / update June 2016

Organisations 
The F.I.P.J.P is composed of the following members elected at last general assembly on 4 October 2012 in Marseilles:
 President: Claude Azema (France)
 Vice-Presidents: Suphonnarth Lamlert (Thailand) & Bernard Aurouze (Canada)
 General Secretary: Céline Peronnet (France)
 General Treasurer: Michel Signaire (France)
 Referee Commission: Laurens Yvon
 Medical Commission: Dr. Giorgio Barone & Dr. Jean-Pierre Cervetti  (France)
 Technical Commission: Victor Nataf (France)
 IT Commissioner: Claude Stirmel (France)
 and 7 other members from Belgium, Czech Republic, Italy, Monaco, Tunisia and Turkey,
F.I.P.J.P. is member of C.M.S.B. - Confédération Mondiale des Sports de Boules (World Confederation for Boule Sports) - which group the following sports: Pétanque, Jeu Provençal, Lyonnaise and Rafa.

See also
 Pétanque
 F.I.P.J.P.
 Mondial la Marseillaise à Pétanque

References

World championships in precision sports
Pétanque